Ringina is a monotypic genus of Australasian sheet weavers containing the single species, Ringina antarctica. It was first described by H. Tambs-Lyche in 1954, and has only been found on the Crozet Islands.

See also
 List of Linyphiidae species (Q–Z)

References

Linyphiidae
Monotypic Araneomorphae genera
Spiders of Oceania